Ringebu may refer to:

Places
Ringebu, a municipality in Innlandet county, Norway
Ringebu (village) (also known as Vålebru), a village in Ringebu municipality in Innlandet county, Norway
Ringebu Stave Church, a church in Ringebu municipality in Innlandet county, Norway
Ringebu Station, a railway station in Ringebu municipality in Innlandet county, Norway